PUBG Mobile is a free-to-play battle royale video game developed by LightSpeed & Quantum Studio, a division of Tencent Games. It is a mobile game adaptation of PUBG: Battlegrounds. It was initially released for Android and iOS on 19 March 2018.

It was published by multiple publishers in different regions, including Krafton, Tencent, and VNG Games. It is also the second most-played mobile video game of all time. In 2021, the game spawned an Indian version, Battlegrounds Mobile India, and a separate game taking place in the PUBG Universe, called New State Mobile.

Gameplay
PUBG Mobile features gameplay similar to that of the original PlayerUnknown's Battlegrounds. Players parachute down to a remote island and fight to remain as the last player standing, competing alone or in teams of two or four, depending on the game mode selected before the match. Each match lasts about 30 minutes. It takes exactly 32 minutes and 50 seconds for the zone to close completely. After than, another 11 seconds or so until you die inside the zone, so potential max of about 33 minutes and 10 seconds if you try to heal yourself.

The game begins with the participants flying in a plane over one of many possible maps, also selected before the match. As they cross the map, players choose where to parachute down. When the plane finishes its flight, a blue border forms around the perimeter of the island, marking the boundary between the safe zone and the exterior blue zone. The safe zone shrinks every few minutes, and anyone left in the blue zone will steadily lose health as long as they remain there, potentially to the point of death. The rate of health loss increases when the safe zone shrinks.

When players first reach the island with no supplies or weapons, they must find them around their environment or loot them from downed players. In general, better weapons and equipment are found in more dangerous parts of the map. In addition to the regular shrinking of the safe zone, temporary red zones may randomly appear to be barraged with bombs, and from time to time, the plane flies over the battlefield to release a package with special equipment, potentially including items that cannot be found elsewhere on the island. All of these special events, including the normal safe zone shrinking, are announced to the players before they occur to give a fair warning.

Additional features unique to the mobile version of PUBG include log-in bonuses, missions and micro-goals, crew recruiting, map and compass improvements with larger and clear markers near the teammates, and an auto loot system, as well as an increased number of bots.

Development
PlayerUnknown’s Battlegrounds (PUBG) Mobile is the mobile adaption of the popular battle royale game, PUBG: Battlegrounds, developed by PUBG Studios and LightSpeed & Quantum Studio, published by Tencent Games worldwide, while Krafton and VNG Games in India, Korea and Vietnam respectively. The game was released in March 2018 and has since become one of the most popular mobile games in the world.

The development of PUBG Mobile took just 4 months to be completed, as multiple teams from around the world contributing to the project. The project began with the original PC and console version of the game, which was developed by Brendan Greene (known as PlayerUnknown) and released in 2017. Following the success of the that particular game, Tencent Games began their own development project with PUBG Studios for the mobile version. In doing so, they had to create an evolution of the Unreal Engine 4, and was optimized to suit the mobile platform, with a focus on smoother performance and enhanced graphics.

An abridged version of the game for lower-end Android devices, PUBG Mobile Lite, was first released in Thailand on 24 January 2019 before releasing in Asian, Latin American, and African countries.

Release 
Following the India 
international deal for the Windows version, Tencent Games and PUBG Corporation announced plans to release two mobile versions of the game in China. The first, PUBG: Exhilarating Battlefield, is an abridged version of the original game, and was developed by LightSpeed & Quantum Studio, an internal division of Tencent Games. The second, PUBG: Army Attack, includes more arcade-style elements, including action taking place on warships, and was developed by Tencent's Timi Studio. Both versions are free-to-play, and were released for Android and iOS devices on 9 February 2017. The games had a combined total of 75 million pre-registrations, and ranked first and second on the Chinese iOS download charts at launch. Following a soft launch in Canada, an English version of Exhilarating Battlefield, localized as PUBG Mobile, was released worldwide on 19 March 2018. PUBG Mobile KR, a Korean and Japanese oriented version and PUBG Mobile VN, a Vietnamese oriented version released in June 2018 and January 2019 respectively.

In China, PUBG Mobile had been awaiting approval by the government for an authorized release, during which the game could only be offered as a public test. However, Tencent's planned release was suspended due to the government approval freeze across most of 2018. By May 2019, Tencent announced it would no longer seek to publish PUBG Mobile in China, but instead would re-release the game under the title Game for Peace; this version of the game changed elements of the original game to meet China's content restrictions, such as eliminating blood and gore. Following its release, a Taiwanese version of the game, PUBG Mobile TW was released.

A version meant for lower-end mobile devices, PUBG Mobile Lite, was released on 25 July 2019. This has support for high FPS gameplay on multiple Android devices, and features a smaller map made for 60 players. The Chinese version of the app was again renamed to Peacekeeper Elite in 2020.

Controversies
On 2 September 2020, the Ministry of Electronics and Information Technology banned PUBG Mobile in India amid the 2020 China-India skirmish. Following this, Tencent Games terminated all services for users in India on 30 October 2020. On 6 May 2021, Krafton announced the relaunch of the game in India, following the ban imposed by the Government of India. Krafton published the game in the country as Battlegrounds Mobile India, which can only be accessed by users in the country.

On 28 January 2022, a 14-year-old from Pakistan shot and killed his entire family. The game was cited as an influence for the murders according to the Punjab police.

Esports

The game supports several e-sport leagues and tournaments. Each major region has a PUBG Mobile Club Open (PMCO) and players compete in their respective regions until later tournaments. Only 32 teams can qualify out of the many teams that signed up. This phase is known as the PMCO group stage, where the 32 teams are divided into four groups of eight. PMCO in India was held in 2019 for the first time, and the winner of the tournament was Naman Mathur and his team. Once the group stages have elapsed, the finals are hosted where the top 16 teams play. From here, the teams compete to make it to a higher level of competition known as the PUBG Mobile Pro League (PMPL). Later, eSports grew a lot in various countries including India, China, Indonesia, and many more, giving opportunities to many potential players.

Update 
Update 2.2: The new update of Pubg mobile has arrived which is named Halloween update. Inside this update, there are 8 powers that we will define. The Pubg team has made many changes to the map this time. Halloween towers are given at some places on the map. Some towers are big, some towers are small and all have different places. Halloween Power You have to select the power you want to use before starting the match. 

Update 2.3: There is a new event related to football in Pubg mobile, which is named football arena or football carnival. This update is a big update like the previous update.  8 things have been added in this update. 

Update 2.4: 30 December, 2022 New Martial Showdown themed mode is here! Experience the splendor of eastern martial arts together!

Gear Front returns! Added 2 new awesome skills for even more strategic depth!

Firearm & Vehicle Improvements: Added the Honey Badger and 2-Seat Bike!

Polaris side-by-side vehicles have entered the battlegrounds!

Cycle 4 Season 10 begins with 4 new titles and a titles archive system. Complete missions to get Legendary items!

Reception 

PUBG Mobile received "generally favourable" reviews according to the review aggregator Metacritic.

Downloads
PUBG Mobile was the second most-downloaded mobile game of 2018, with nearly 300million downloads worldwide. The game's largest market was China, which accounted for 29% of the game's downloads, followed by India and the United States, each with about 10% (30million) of its downloads. It was the most-installed battle royale game of 2018, with about 200million more installs than Fortnite. In March 2021, PUBG Mobile had accumulated more than a billion downloads outside of China. Including Peacekeeper Elite, the Chinese version of the game, and Battlegrounds Mobile India, the game had a total player count of around 1.3 billion as of December 2022.

Revenue
PUBG Mobile grossed  in Japan in 2018. That figure had increased to over $9 billion as of December 2022.

Awards

References

External links

2018 video games
Android (operating system) games
Battle royale games
First-person shooter multiplayer online games
Free-to-play video games
IOS games
Multiplayer online games
Unreal Engine games
Video games containing battle passes
Video games developed in China
Internet censorship in India